The Shaki Valley is a residential area in the Jaghatu district of Ghazni province in Afghanistan.

Demographics 
This area is inhabited by ethnic Hazara.

References 

Jaghatū District
Valleys of Afghanistan
Hazarajat
Ghazni Province